Baron Denham, of Weston Underwood in the County of Buckingham, is a title in the Peerage of the United Kingdom. It was created in 1937 for Sir George Bowyer, 1st Baronet, a Conservative politician who had earlier represented Buckingham in the House of Commons. He had already been created a baronet, of Weston Underwood, in 1933. Bowyer was a great-great-great-grandson of Sir William Bowyer, 3rd Baronet, of Denham Court (see below).  the titles are held by his second but only surviving son, the 2nd Baron, who succeeded in 1948. In 1950 he also succeeded his distant relative in the Bowyer baronetcy, of Denham Court. Like his father, the 2nd Baron Denham was a Conservative politician and one of the ninety elected hereditary peers that remain in the House of Lords after the passing of the House of Lords Act 1999.

The Bowyer baronetcy, of Denham Court in the County of Buckingham, was created in the Baronetage of England in 1660 for William Bowyer. He represented Buckinghamshire in the House of Commons.

His great-great-grandson Sir George Bowyer, the 5th Baronet, was an Admiral in the Royal Navy and distinguished himself at the Battle of the Glorious First of June in 1794. For this he was created a baronet, of Radley in the County of Berkshire, in his own right. In 1799 he also succeeded his elder brother in the baronetcy of Denham Court. His son, the 6th and 2nd Baronet, sat as Member of Parliament for Malmesbury and Abingdon. He was succeeded by his son, the 7th and 3rd Baronet, who represented Dundalk and County Wexford in Parliament as a Liberal. On the death in 1950 of his nephew, the 9th and 5th Baronet, the baronetcy of Radley became extinct. The late Baronet was succeeded in the baronetcy of Denham Court by his distant relative the 2nd Baron Denham, 2nd Baronet, of Weston Underwood (see above), who became the 10th Baronet. The titles remain united.

The family seat is The Laundry Cottage, near Weston Underwood, Buckinghamshire.

Bowyer baronets, of Denham Court (1660)
Sir William Bowyer, 1st Baronet (1612–1679)
Sir William Bowyer, 2nd Baronet (1639–1722)
Sir William Bowyer, 3rd Baronet (1710–1767)
Sir William Bowyer, 4th Baronet (1736–1799)
Sir George Bowyer, 5th and 1st Baronet (1739–1800, himself created a baronet, of Radley, in 1794)
Sir George Bowyer, 6th and 2nd Baronet (1783–1860)
Sir George Bowyer, 7th and 3rd Baronet (1811–1883)
Sir William Bowyer, 8th and 4th Baronet (1812–1893)
Sir George Henry Bowyer, 9th and 5th Baronet (1870–1950)

The baronetcy of Radley became extinct with the death of the 9th/5th Baronet.
For further succession in the baronetcy of Denham Court, see Baron Denham (1937).

Bowyer baronets, of Radley (1794)
Sir George Bowyer, 5th and 1st Baronet (1739–1800, inherited the 1660 baronetcy from his brother, who died without issue in 1799)
Sir George Bowyer, 6th and 2nd Baronet (1783–1860)
Sir George Bowyer, 7th and 3rd Baronet (1811–1883)
Sir William Bowyer, 8th and 4th Baronet (1812–1893)
Sir George Henry Bowyer, 9th and 5th Baronet (1870–1950)

Baronetcy extinct.

Bowyer baronets, of Weston Underwood (1933)
Sir George Edward Wentworth Bowyer, 1st Baronet (1886–1948, created Baron Denham in 1937)

Baron Denham (1937)
George Edward Wentworth Bowyer, 1st Baron Denham, 1st Baronet (1886–1948)
Bertram Stanley Mitford Bowyer, 2nd Baron Denham, 10th and 2nd Baronet (1927–2021)
Inherited the Bowyer baronetcy, of Denham Court, in 1950. Had previously succeeded as baronet, of Weston Underwood, and Baron Denham.
Richard Grenville George Bowyer, 3rd Baron Denham, 11th and 3rd Baronet (born 1959)

The heir presumptive is his brother, the Hon. Henry Martin Mitford Bowyer (born 1963).
The heir presumptive's heir apparent is his only son, Edmund Hunter Mitford Bowyer (born 1997).

Male-line family tree

References
 Kidd, Charles, Williamson, David (editors). Debrett's Peerage and Baronetage (1990 edition). New York: St Martin's Press, 1990,

External links
Catholic Encyclopedia article on the seventh Baronet of Denham Court

Baronies in the Peerage of the United Kingdom
Noble titles created in 1937
Noble titles created for UK MPs